Walter Scott Hartley  (August 22, 1880 – July 18, 1948) was an outfielder in Major League Baseball. He played for the New York Giants in 1902.

External links

1880 births
1948 deaths
Baseball players from Philadelphia
Major League Baseball outfielders
New York Giants (NL) players
Holyoke Paperweights players
Lancaster Red Roses players
Altoona Mountaineers players
Wilmington Peaches players
Harrisburg Senators players
Albany Senators players
San Francisco Seals (baseball) players
Spokane Indians players
Troy Trojans (minor league) players
Binghamton Bingoes players